Cooks Brook is a stream in Newfoundland, Canada that runs into the Humber Arm, on the west coast of the island.  There is a day use park at the ocean, which is used by kayakers.

The stream was named for Captain James Cook, who surveyed the area in 1767.

References

External links
America/Canada/Newfoundland/_5927203_Cooks Brook.html#local_map Cooks Brook map

Rivers of Newfoundland and Labrador